S. Krishnaswamy is an Indian documentary film-maker and writer who won the Padma Shri award in 2009. His recent works include three documentaries on the Indian influence in Southeast Asia: Indian Imprints, A Different Pilgrimage, and Tracking Indian Footmarks. Indian Imprints was broadcast on Doordarshan in 18 episodes.

Books
 Indian Film (with Erik Barnouw)  (Columbia University Press 1963, Oxford University Press 1980)

Awards
 2009: Padma Shri
 2009: Hamsadhwani Distinguished Citizen of the Year Award

Notes

External links
 Krishnaswamy Associates

Living people
Indian documentary filmmakers
Indian film historians
Recipients of the Padma Shri in arts
Indian television producers
1938 births
People from Tamil Nadu